Jos Jansen (born 8 January 1954) is a Belgian rallycross driver. He formerly competed in the FIA World Rallycross Championship.

Results

FIA World Rallycross Championship

Supercar

External links
 Website

Living people
1954 births
Belgian racing drivers
European Rallycross Championship drivers
World Rallycross Championship drivers
Sportspeople from Limburg (Belgium)
20th-century Belgian people